Shirley Anne Langrope (born 15 November 1945) is a former New Zealand netball player who competed for her country at the 1971 and 1975 Netball World Championships.

Early life
Langrope was born on 15 November 1945 in Akaroa, on Banks Peninsula, and was educated at Akaroa District High School (now Akaroa Area School).

Netball career
Langrope played netball for the Canterbury team, which in the 1960s was very strong, and also played for the South Island. She became known for her athleticism, particularly her jumping ability, which led to her being given the nickname of "frog".

First selected for the national team in June 1969 when Judy Blair pulled out to attend her brother's wedding, Langrope played in two tests against Australia that year. She was then selected for the 1971 World Netball Championships, which were held in Kingston, when New Zealand finished second, with the players being away from home for three months. In 1974, she captained the New Zealand team that toured England, and in 1975 she was again captain for the World Championships, which were held in Auckland. She was the only player from the 1971 team who was selected for the 1975 tournament. However, injuries prevented her from playing a significant role in the latter tournament, in which New Zealand finished third despite the home advantage. Langrope retired from playing immediately after the championships, having played 19 games for New Zealand. 

In 2000, at a celebration of Netball New Zealand's 75th anniversary, a New Zealand "dream team" of the 20th century was named, with Langrope selected on the bench in the midcourt.

Later life
Langrope became a schoolteacher and lived in Auckland. In 1992, she moved back to Christchurch to teach at South New Brighton School, where she was still a staff member in 2021.

References

External links
 Photograph of Langrope with fellow New Zealand netball representatives Joan Harnett and Sandra Norman boarding a plane at Christchurch Airport on 19 October 1970
 Photographs of Canterbury members of the New Zealand netball team arriving at Christchurch Airport on 23 January 1971

1945 births
Living people
Sportspeople from Akaroa
New Zealand international netball players
1971 World Netball Championships players
1975 World Netball Championships players